Jennifer Falls is an American sitcom created by Matthew Carlson, and starring Jaime Pressly in the title role. The series premiered on TV Land on June 4, 2014, and is the first single-camera comedy series for the network. It was cancelled on October 3, 2014, after ten episodes.

Plot
The series follows Jennifer Doyle (Jaime Pressly), a single mother who, after losing her high salary job, has to move back in with her mother, Maggie (Jessica Walter). From there, Jennifer must reassess her life and figure out how to rebuild.

Cast

Main
 Jaime Pressly as Jennifer Doyle
 Jessica Walter as Maggie Doyle, Jennifer's mother
 Missi Pyle as Dina Simac, Jennifer's childhood friend
 Ethan Suplee as Wayne Doyle, Jennifer's brother
 Nora Kirkpatrick as Stephanie Doyle, Jennifer's sister-in-law
 Dylan Gelula as Gretchen Doyle, Jennifer's daughter

Recurring
 Chris D'Elia as Adam, Jennifer's younger ex-boyfriend and Gretchen's father

Episodes

Production and development
On August 5, 2013, TV Land placed a multi-camera pilot order on Jennifer Falls, with Jaime Pressly identified for the lead role. The pilot was written by Matthew Carlson. Larry W. Jones, Keith Cox, Mindy Schultheis and Michael Hanel serve as executive producers, alongside Acme Productions.

Casting announcements on the remaining series regular roles began in September 2013, with Missi Pyle first cast in the role of Dina, Jennifer's childhood best friend, who is hesitant to restart the friendship when Jennifer returns to town. Dylan Gelula was the next actor cast in the series regular role of Gretchen, Jennifer's energetic and complicated daughter. Jessica Walter then joined the series as Maggie, Jennifer's warm and welcoming yet slightly narcissistic mother. Shortly after, Nora Kirkpatrick and Joel David Moore were cast in the series, with Kirkpatrick cast in the role of Stephanie, Jennifer's sister-in-law and new boss. Moore was tapped play the role of Wayne, Jennifer's brother who owns the bar where she begins to work.

On January 27, 2014, TV Land placed a series order on Jennifer Falls, set to premiere in 2014. The series was originally conceived as a multi-camera before being converted into single-camera. A month after the series order, Ethan Suplee replaced Joel David Moore in the role of Wayne, reuniting Pressly and Suplee who had previously co-starred together in My Name is Earl. Jennifer Falls is the second TV Land original series in which Jessica Walter has appeared, following the sitcom Retired at 35 which was cancelled in 2012 after two seasons.

Reception 
On Rotten Tomatoes, the series has an aggregate score of 56% based on 5 positive and 4 negative critic reviews.

References

External links
 
 

2014 American television series debuts
2014 American television series endings
2010s American single-camera sitcoms
English-language television shows
TV Land original programming
Television series by Endemol